Édouard H. Léger (April 23, 1866 – August 8, 1892) was a physician and political figure in New Brunswick, Canada. He represented Kent in the House of Commons of Canada from 1890 to 1892 as a Conservative member.

He was born in Grande-Digue, New Brunswick, the son of Hypolite Léger. He taught school for one year before continuing his education at St. Joseph's College in Memramcook. In 1888, he graduated with  an M.D. from the Detroit Medical College. Later that year, he married Élise Michaud. Léger was first elected to the House of Commons in an 1890 by-election held after Pierre-Amand Landry resigned his seat to accept an appointment as judge. He died in office at the age of 26.

Electoral record

References 
 
The Canadian parliamentary companion, 1891 JA Gemmill

1866 births
1892 deaths
St. Joseph's College alumni
Members of the House of Commons of Canada from New Brunswick
Conservative Party of Canada (1867–1942) MPs
People from Kent County, New Brunswick
Wayne State University alumni